McCoy is a common surname of unrelated Scottish and Irish origin. It was anglicized into the Scottish name from the Irish McGee and McHugh surnames in Irish Mac Aodha. It is an Anglicisation of its Irish form Mac Aodha, meaning son of Aodh (a name of a deity in Irish mythology and an Irish word for "fire"). The first bearers of the surname Mac Aodha were the grandsons of Aodh (died 1033), who was son of Ruaidhrí mac Coscraigh, King of South Connacht, Ireland The surname McCoy in Ulster however particularly Northern Ireland is most likely from the gallowglass, Scottish mercenaries who came to Ireland in the 14th century, and the Scottish MacKays that arrived later in the 17th and 18th centuries in the ulster plantations and became McCoys.

People
One of the families in the 19th century Hatfield-McCoy feud in Kentucky/West Virginia
Al McCoy (announcer), American sports broadcaster
Al McCoy (boxer) (1894–1966), middleweight champion boxer
Alban McCoy (born 1951), British priest and writer, former Catholic Chaplain of Cambridge University
Alfred McCoy (American football) (1899–1990), American college sports coach
Alfred W. McCoy, American author and scholar of the Asian heroin drug trade
Alice McCoy (politician), member of the South Dakota House of Representatives.
Andy McCoy, Finnish guitarist of Hanoi Rocks
Barry M. McCoy, American physicist
Bob McCoy (1934–2016), American basketball player and coach
Brian McCoy (1943–1975), Irish musician, trumpet player
Carl McCoy, musician
Charlie McCoy (born 1941), American musician
Clyde McCoy (1903–1990), American jazz trumpeter
Colt McCoy (born 1986), American football quarterback
Dave McCoy (1915–2020), American businessman and skier
Elaine McCoy (born 1946), Canadian senator
Elijah McCoy (1844–1929), inventor, automatic machinery lubricator, lawn sprinkler, cited as the inspiration for the phrase "The Real McCoy"
Erik McCoy (born 1997), American football player
Ernie McCoy (athletic director) (1904–1980), American collegiate athletic director
Ernie McCoy (racing driver), Formula One driver
Ethel Bergstresser McCoy (1893–1980), of New York City
Freddie McCoy (1932-2009), American soul-jazz vibraphonist
Frederick McCoy (1823–1899), British palaeontologist
Garry McCoy (1972–), Australian motorcycle racer
George McCoy, author of a guide to sexual services in Britain
Gerald McCoy, American football player
Gerry McCoy (born 1960), Scottish football player
Horace McCoy (1897–1955), American writer
Jack E. McCoy (1929-2014), American politician
Jake McCoy (1942-2021), American hockey player
Janet J. McCoy, American administrator and politician
Jason McCoy (1970–), Canadian singer/songwriter
Jason L. McCoy (1971– ), Attorney, Mayor of the Town of Vernon, Connecticut Politician
Jelani McCoy (born 1977), American basketball player
Jeremy McCoy, (1963– ), American-Canadian double bassist with Metropolitan Opera Orchestra
Joseph McCoy, 19th-century cattle baron 
Kansas Joe McCoy (1905–1950), American musician
Kellen McCoy (1987–), American basketball player and coach
Kevin McCoy (artist) (1967–), American artist
Kevin McCoy (rector), rector of the Pontifical North American College.
Kid McCoy (1872–1940), boxer (born Norman Selby)
LeRon McCoy (1982–), American football wide receiver
LeSean McCoy (1988–), American football running back
Marvin McCoy (born 1988), professional footballer
Matt McCoy (actor) (born 1958), American actor
Matt McCoy (American football) (1982–), American football linebacker
Matt McCoy (Iowa politician), member of the Iowa Senate
Mike McCoy (disambiguation), multiple people                                  
Obed McCoy (born 1997) West Indies cricket player
Papa Charlie McCoy (1909–1950), American musician
Paul McCoy, musician
Randolph McCoy of the Hatfield–McCoy feud, also called Randolph "Ole Ran'l" McCoy.
Richard McCoy, Jr., airplane hijacker
Richard McCoy (politician) (1863–1942), Australian politician
Richard B. McCoy (died 1902), American politician
Rico McCoy, American football player
Robert McCoy, member of the United States House of Representatives
Robert Bruce McCoy, United States National Guard officer
Rose Marie McCoy (1922–2015), American songwriter
Simon McCoy, British journalist and newsreader
Stephen McCoy (1948–1989), American serial killer
Steve McCoy, radio morning show host
Sylvester McCoy (1943–), Scottish actor
Tim McCoy (1891–1978), American actor 
Tony McCoy, Irish National Hunt jockey
Travis McCoy, member of the hip-hop group Gym Class Heroes
Van McCoy (1940–1979), music producer and songwriter
Walter R. McCoy (1880–1952), stamp collector from New York City
William D. McCoy (1853–1893), American diplomat
William S. McCoy (1877–1948), American rum–runner
Wilson McCoy (1902–1961), American artist and cartoonist

Fictional characters
Alice McCoy (Digimon), in  Digimon Tamers
Danny McCoy, in Las Vegas, a TV series
Ebenezar McCoy, a mentor in the book series: The Dresden Files by Jim Butcher
Dr. Henry "Hank" P. McCoy, aka 'Beast' from Marvel Comics' X-Men
Jack McCoy, in the Law & Order TV series
Josie McCoy, in the Josie and the Pussycats franchise
Leonard McCoy, a doctor on Star Trek: The Original Series
Ray McCoy, the main character of the 1997 video game Blade Runner
Sherman McCoy, in The Bonfire of the Vanities
Willie "Slim" McCoy, in the 1972 song "You Don't Mess Around with Jim" by Jim Croce

See also
 General McCoy (disambiguation)
 Senator McCoy (disambiguation)
 The real McCoy

References

External links
 About.com - Origin for the Surname MacCoy
 Araltas.com - McCoy Coats of Arms